is a railway station in the city of Shimada, Shizuoka Prefecture, Japan,  operated by the Ōigawa Railway. Its location was formerly the town of Kawane, which was merged into Shimada in 2008.

Lines
Ieyama Station is on the Ōigawa Main Line and is 17.1 from the terminus of the line at Kanaya Station.

Station layout
The station has a single island platform, with two headshunts on either side, connected to the station building by a level crossing. The rustic wooden station building is popular with photographers who come to shoot the steam locomotives on the line. It was also used as a location for a number of movies, including Otoko wa Tsurai yo.

Adjacent stations

|-
!colspan=5|Ōigawa Railway

Station history
Ieyama Station was one of the original stations of the Ōigawa Main Line, and was opened on December 1, 1929.

Passenger statistics
In fiscal 2017, the station was used by an average of 167 passengers daily (boarding passengers only).

Surrounding area
former Kawane Town Hall
Kawane Junior High School
Kawane Elementary School

See also
 List of Railway Stations in Japan

References

External links

 Ōigawa Railway home page

Stations of Ōigawa Railway
Railway stations in Shizuoka Prefecture
Railway stations in Japan opened in 1929
Shimada, Shizuoka